Psychrobacter frigidicola is a  psychrophilic, oxidase-positive, halotolerant, Gram-negative, nonmotile bacterium of the genus Psychrobacter which was isolated from the Antarctic.

References

Further reading

External links
Type strain of Psychrobacter frigidicola at BacDive -  the Bacterial Diversity Metadatabase

Moraxellaceae
Bacteria described in 1996
Psychrophiles
Halophiles